Itcha may refer to:

Philosophical and religious concepts
Itcha shakti

Places
Itcha Ilgachuz Provincial Park
Itcha Lake
Itcha Mountain
Itcha Range